Alan Wesley Quine (born February 25, 1993) is a Canadian professional ice hockey player. He currently plays with the Ontario Reign in the American Hockey League (AHL). Quine was selected by the New York Islanders in the 6th round (166th overall) of the 2013 NHL Entry Draft.

Playing career

Junior
Drafted by the Kingston Frontenacs in the first round (2nd overall) of the 2009 Ontario Hockey League (OHL) Priority Selection, Quine played 252 games in the OHL with the Kingston Frontenacs, Peterborough Petes, and Belleville Bulls, registering a total of 90 goals and 128 assists for 218 points, and 218 penalty minutes. Following the 2010–11 OHL season, Quine was selected by the Detroit Red Wings in the 3rd round of the 2011 NHL Entry Draft however, he did not sign with the Red Wings and continued to play major junior hockey in the OHL. Following the 2012–13 OHL season, Quine again heard his name called in the NHL Entry Draft, this time by the New York Islanders who picked him in the 6th round.

Professional
On September 28, 2013, the New York Islanders signed Quine to a three-year, entry-level contract, and he was assigned to play the 2013–14 season with the Bridgeport Sound Tigers of the AHL.

On April 9, 2016, Quine was called up from the Sound Tigers and made his NHL debut for the Islanders in a game against the Buffalo Sabres where he scored his first NHL point with a goal. On April 14, 2016, Quine scored his first NHL playoff point by having an assist. On April 22, 2016, Quine scored his first playoff and overtime goal.

Having not received a qualifying offer from the Islanders, Quine left as a free agent following the 2017–18 season. On July 1, 2018, he agreed to a one-year, two-way contract with the Calgary Flames.

After two seasons within the Flames organization, Quine left as a free agent to sign a one-year, $750,000 contract with rival club, the Edmonton Oilers on October 9, 2020.

Leaving the Oilers as a free agent following the  season having played exclusively with minor-league affiliate, the Bakersfield Condors, Quine opted to extend his career in the AHL by agreeing to a one-year deal with the Henderson Silver Knights on September 1, 2021.

As an un-signed free agent heading into the  season, Quine was signed to continue his career in the AHL, agreeing to a contract with the Ontario Reign, primary affiliate to the Los Angeles Kings, on August 18, 2022.

International play
At the 2010 World U-17 Hockey Challenge, Quine settled for a silver medal with Team Ontario, despite being named the player-of-the-game in the final championship match. Quine won gold with Team Canada at the 2010 Ivan Hlinka Memorial Tournament, and he also competed at the 2011 IIHF World U18 Championships where he scored seven points in seven games, however Team Canada finished the tournament ranked fourth.

Career statistics

Regular season and playoffs

International

Awards and honors

References

External links

1993 births
Bakersfield Condors players
Belleville Bulls players
Bridgeport Sound Tigers players
Calgary Flames players
Canadian ice hockey centres
Detroit Red Wings draft picks
Grand Rapids Griffins players
Henderson Silver Knights players
Ice hockey people from Ontario
Kingston Frontenacs players
Living people
New York Islanders draft picks
New York Islanders players
Ontario Reign (AHL) players
Peterborough Petes (ice hockey) players
Stockton Heat players
Stockton Thunder players
Sportspeople from Belleville, Ontario